Bengal College of Engineering & Technology for Women, is a private engineering institution in Durgapur, West Bengal, India which offers undergraduate(B.Tech) four-year engineering degree courses in five disciplines. The college is affiliated to Maulana Abul Kalam Azad University of Technology(MAKAUT).

Departments
It offers admission to five branches:
 computer science and engineering 
 electronics and communication engineering 
 mechanical engineering 
 civil engineering 
 electrical engineering

See also

References

External links 
http://bcetdgp.ac.in

Engineering colleges in West Bengal
Universities and colleges in Paschim Bardhaman district
Colleges affiliated to West Bengal University of Technology
2001 establishments in West Bengal
Educational institutions established in 2001